The following is a list of teams which competed in the A1 Grand Prix series.  29 teams participated in at least one A1 Grand Prix race.

A1 team list and statistics

Notes

References 

 
Teams